Kyzyl Yar (Qıźılyar) is a rural locality (a village) in Zilim-Karanovsky Selsoviet, Gafuriysky District, Bashkortostan, Russia. The population was 49 as of 2010. There are 2 streets.

Geography 
Kyzyl Yar is located 56 km north of Krasnousolsky (the district's administrative centre) by road. Abdullino is the nearest rural locality.

References 

Rural localities in Gafuriysky District